Clarence Cofield Woods (June 11, 1892 – July 2, 1969) was a professional baseball pitcher. He appeared in two games in Major League Baseball for the Indianapolis Hoosiers of the Federal League in 1914.

External links

Major League Baseball pitchers
Indianapolis Hoosiers players
Baseball players from Indiana
1892 births
1969 deaths